Young America Township is one of fifteen townships in Edgar County, Illinois, USA.  As of the 2010 census, its population was 726 and it contained 364 housing units.

History

In the early 19th century, the current Young America township and the current Shiloh Township comprised a single township, known as Bull Head Township.

Geography

Cities, towns, villages
 Hume (vast majority)
 Metcalf

Extinct towns
 Hildreth
 McCown
 Palermo

Cemeteries
The township contains Young America Cemetery. The Young America Cemetery Association was organized in 1896, with forty shares of stock sold to purchase the grounds. The first interment in the cemetery was Byron Stark, 5 years of age, who died 26 June 1896. In 1898, the Association's stockholders asked the village of Hume to take over the cemetery and its debts, but the village refused. In April 1960, the voters of Young America Township voted to support the cemetery. The current tool house and flagpole were erected in 1960.

Major highways
  US Route 36
  Illinois Route 49

Airports and landing strips
 Hildreth Air Park
 Richardson Landing Strip

Demographics

School districts
 Heritage Community Unit School District 8
 Jamaica Community Unit School District 12
 Shiloh Community Unit School District 1

Political districts
 Illinois's 15th congressional district
 State House District 110
 State Senate District 55

References
 
 United States Census Bureau 2007 TIGER/Line Shapefiles
 United States National Atlas

External links
 City-Data.com
 Illinois State Archives
 Edgar County Official Site

Townships in Edgar County, Illinois
Townships in Illinois